Steven V. Carter (October 8, 1915 – November 4, 1959) was a Democratic U.S. Representative from south central Iowa in 1959.

Born in Carterville, Utah, at age fourteen Carter moved with his parents to Lamoni, Iowa, and graduated from Lamoni High School. He graduated from Graceland College in Lamoni, Iowa, in 1934, the University of Iowa in 1937, and the University of Iowa College of Law in 1939.

Admitted to the bar in 1939, Carter commenced the practice of law in Leon, Iowa. He served as county attorney of Decatur County, Iowa from 1940 to 1944, but his tenure ended when he enlisted in the United States Navy, serving as a supply officer in the South Pacific Theatre in World War II. After the war, he then served as city attorney of Leon from 1946 to 1948.

In 1948, 1950, and 1956, Carter was an unsuccessful Democratic candidate for the U.S. House seat held by Karl M. LeCompte. He formally challenged the outcome of the 1956 election, but in 1958 Congress rejected his challenge. When LeCompte did not seek re-election in 1958, Carter ran again for the House, and won, defeating Republican John Henry Kyl.

Carter had suffered from cancer before his election to Congress, but believed that he had fully recovered.  However, during his first month in Congress doctors determined that the cancer had returned, and he was soon hospitalized.  Carter served from January 3, 1959, until his death in Bethesda, Maryland, on November 4, 1959. Kyl then won a special election to fill the vacancy.

Carter was interred in Leon Cemetery, Leon, Iowa.

See also
 List of United States Congress members who died in office (1950–99)

References

External links
 

 The Steven V. Carter Papers are housed at the University of Iowa Special Collections & University Archives.

1915 births
1959 deaths
People from Lamoni, Iowa
Graceland University alumni
Deaths from cancer in Maryland
University of Iowa College of Law alumni
United States Navy officers
Democratic Party members of the United States House of Representatives from Iowa
People from Leon, Iowa
Iowa lawyers
20th-century American lawyers
United States Navy personnel of World War II
20th-century American politicians
Military personnel from Iowa